Takkarist Jaune McKinley (born November 2, 1995) is an American football defensive end who is a free agent. He played college football at UCLA and was drafted by the Atlanta Falcons in the first round of the 2017 NFL Draft.

Early years
McKinley attended Kennedy High School in Richmond, California. He played for the Eagles football team. He had 50 tackles and 15 sacks as a junior and 60 tackles and 11 sacks as a senior. He also ran track in high school.

College career
McKinley originally committed to the University of California, Berkeley but was ruled a non-qualifier and attended Contra Costa College. During his one season at Contra Costa College in 2013, he had 33 tackles and 10 sacks. In September 2014, he transferred to the University of California, Los Angeles (UCLA). He played in 10 games that season, making one start, and finished the year with 2.5 sacks. As a junior in 2015, McKinley started 12 of 13 games, recording 35 tackles and 3.5 sacks. As a senior in 2016, he recorded 10 sacks.

Professional career

McKinley was invited to the NFL Combine as an outside linebacker and completed all the combine drills except for the short shuttle and three-cone drill. He went under surgery to repair a torn labrum and a fracture in his shoulder socket after the combine. His recovery time was expected to take four to six months, making him unable to participate at UCLA's Pro Day. NFL draft analysts projected McKinley to be selected within the first two rounds.

Atlanta Falcons
McKinley was drafted by the Atlanta Falcons in the first round (26th overall) of the 2017 NFL Draft. On May 11, McKinley signed a four-year, $10.21 million contract with $7.89 million guaranteed and a signing bonus of $5.57 million. He played in all 16 games, recording 20 tackles and six sacks, good for fourth in the league among rookies and second on the team behind Adrian Clayborn.

In Week 4 of the 2018 season, against the Cincinnati Bengals, McKinley recorded a career-high three sacks in a 37–36 loss. He finished the season with 22 combined tackles and a team-high seven sacks. In 2019, McKinley played in 14 games with 13 starts, recording 29 tackles and 3.5 sacks. He suffered a shoulder injury in Week 15 and was placed on injured reserve on December 17, 2019. On April 29, 2020, the Falcons declined the fifth-year option on McKinley's contract.

In November 2020, McKinley publicly requested to be traded after privately requesting the Falcons since 2019, who had turned down several trade offers from other teams. He was waived by the team shortly after. The same month, McKinley was claimed off waivers by the Cincinnati Bengals and San Francisco 49ers but had his contracts for both voided due to failed physicals.

Las Vegas Raiders
McKinley was claimed off waivers by the Las Vegas Raiders on November 23, 2020. Prior to joining the Raiders, McKinley was claimed by but had failed physicals with the Cincinnati Bengals and then the San Francisco 49ers. He was placed on injured reserve on November 27, 2020. He was designated to return from injured reserve on December 15, and began practicing with the team again, but head coach Jon Gruden announced on December 30 that he would not be activated.

Cleveland Browns
McKinley signed a one-year contract with the Cleveland Browns on March 17, 2021. In Week 14, McKinley had two tackles and a sack, including a forced fumble on Tyler Huntley in a 24-22 win over the Baltimore Ravens. He suffered a torn Achilles in the game and was placed on season-ending injured reserve on December 21. He finished the season with 18 tackles, 2.5 sacks and a forced fumble through 11 games.

Tennessee Titans
On September 16, 2022, McKinley signed with the practice squad of the Tennessee Titans.

Los Angeles Rams
On September 21, 2022, McKinley was signed by the Los Angeles Rams off the practice squad of the Tennessee Titans. His contract was terminated by the Los Angeles Rams on October 18, 2022.

Dallas Cowboys
On November 16, 2022, McKinley signed with the Dallas Cowboys practice squad, reuniting with defensive coordinator Dan Quinn, who was his head coach with the Falcons.

NFL statistics

References

External links
Cleveland Browns bio
UCLA Bruins bio

1995 births
Living people
American football defensive ends
Atlanta Falcons players
Cleveland Browns players
Contra Costa Comets football players
Dallas Cowboys players
Las Vegas Raiders players
Los Angeles Rams players
Players of American football from Oakland, California
Tennessee Titans players
UCLA Bruins football players